Moinuddin Khan  (born April 14, 1997) is an Indian professional footballer who plays as a forward for Himalayan Sherpa Club in the Martyr's Memorial A-Division League.

Career

Minerva Punjab

Moinuddin Khan began gis professional club career with Minerva Academy FC (later known as Minerva Punjab) in 2016. Khan was part of the team that took in its first major tournament, I-League 2nd Division, and were the runners-up for the season. They lost to five-time I-League champions Dempo SC in the final. They were promoted to I-League after an impressive stint at the 2nd Division. They finished their first-ever 2016–17 I-League season at the second last position. They also participated in the 2016 Durand Cup, and came last in the group stage and hence couldn't qualify for the semi-finals.

Khan perfectly introduced himself to the Indian Football scene when he scored the equalizer against Mohun Bagan and earned a point for Minerva Punjab when the 2017–18 I-League season kicked off. Khan was really impressive as an attacking outlet for his team and played especially well against the Mariners in both matches.

Khan has proved to be a versatile attacker as he can play as an attacking midfielder as well as a second striker.

Mohun Bagan
In 2018, he moved to I-League giants Mohun Bagan AC. He appeared in the Calcutta Football League.

Return to Minerva
Without any league appearance with Mohun Bagan, Khan moved back to Minerva Punjab in 2018. He scored one goal in fifteen league matches of the 2018–19 I-League. The team then achieved third place under guidance of manager Yan Law, in the 2019–20 I-League season.

Himalayan Sherpa
In November 2021, Khan moved to Nepal and signed with Martyr's Memorial A-Division League side Himalayan Sherpa Club on a season-long deal. He debuted on 20 November in a match against Sankata Boys SC, that ended 1–1.

Career statistics

Honours
Minerva Punjab
I-League: 2017–18
Punjab State League: 2018
J&K Invitational Cup: 2018
Mohun Bagan
Calcutta Football League: 2018–19

See also
 List of Indian football players in foreign leagues

References

External links

1997 births
Living people
Indian footballers
India youth international footballers
Association football forwards
RoundGlass Punjab FC players
I-League players
Sportspeople from Indore
Footballers from Madhya Pradesh
Indian expatriate footballers
Expatriate footballers in Nepal